De Rust is a small village at the gateway to the Klein Karoo, South Africa. The name is Dutch and literally translates to "The Rest", referring to the town's original purpose of being a resting place for settlers en route through the challenging terrain of a nearby Swartberg gorge.

Location
De Rust is located at the foot of the Swartberg Mountain range between Oudtshoorn and Beaufort West.

De Rust is also known for the meandering Meiringspoort pass. 
Meiringspoort is a gateway that connects the Klein Karoo (little Karoo) and the (great) Karoo through a gorge with a 25 km road crossing the same river 25 times in the span of the 25 km. The annual Meiringspoort half marathon runs through the length of the pass and finishes in De Rust.

Climate

Farming
This area is also well known for ostrich farming and most of the farmers in the area either farm exclusively with ostriches or as a sideline to their existing farming.

References

Karoo
Populated places in the Oudtshoorn Local Municipality